Bayshore/NASA is a light rail station operated by Santa Clara Valley Transportation Authority (VTA), located in Mountain View, California. This station is served by the Orange Line of the VTA Light Rail system.

Service

Location
The station is on Manila Drive at the Ellis Street entrance to the NASA Ames Research Center and Moffett Federal Airfield.

Station layout

References

External links

The Tasman West Light Rail Project: Art and Aesthetics Program at VTA

Santa Clara Valley Transportation Authority light rail stations
Railway stations in Mountain View, California
Railway stations in the United States opened in 1999
1999 establishments in California
Moffett Field